Edward Thomas Hall, CBE, Hon. FBA, FSA (10 May 1924 – 11 August 2001), also known as Teddy Hall, was a British scientist and balloonist who is best remembered for exposing the Piltdown Man as a fraud.

Life
Edward Thomas Hall was born in London, the son of Walter D'Arcy Hall and Anne Madeleine Hall, he was educated at Eton College and New College, Oxford, where he received his DPhil in 1953. In 1943, he joined the RNVR as an ordinary seaman, serving in landing craft transporting commandos to France.

Hall was also a hot-air-balloon pilot and owner of Cameron O-84 Flaming Pearl G-AYAJ 1970–1990. He was a member of the Air Squadron.

He married South African model Jennifer De La Harpe and had two sons Bill and Martin.

In 1962, Hall co-developed, with his friend Robin Cavendish, a wheelchair with a built-in respirator that allowed Cavendish, who was paralyzed from the neck down from polio and required a medical respirator to breathe, to leave the confinement of his bed. This chair became the model for future devices of its type, with Cavendish eventually using a total of 10 different chairs.
This part of Hall's life is shown in the 2017 film Breathe.

At various times in his life he was a trustee of the National Gallery, the British Museum and Prime Warden of the Goldsmiths Company.

Achievements

He was influential in exposing the Piltdown Man fraud which led to his founding the Research Laboratory for Archaeology and the History of Art, Oxford University.
He founded Littlemore Scientific Engineering Company (ELSEC).
He helped to date the Shroud of Turin to the period 1260–1390. 
He built the Littlemore Clock in the 1990s, which is the most accurate pendulum clock ever built.

References

Obituaries
Wright, Pearce (20 August 2001). "Professor ET 'Teddy' Hall:Scientist who exposed the Piltdown Man fraud and dated the Turin Shroud as a medieval fake". The Guardian.
"Professor E T 'Teddy' Hall". The Daily Telegraph. 17 August 2001.
Saxon, Wolfgang (21 August 2001). "E. T. Hall, 77, Archaeologist Who Debunked Piltdown Man". The New York Times.

English scientists
Alumni of New College, Oxford
People educated at Eton College
English balloonists
Academics of the University of Oxford
1924 births
2001 deaths
Royal Naval Volunteer Reserve personnel of World War II
Fellows of the Society of Antiquaries of London
Commanders of the Order of the British Empire
People associated with the National Gallery, London
Trustees of the British Museum
Royal Navy sailors
Honorary Fellows of the British Academy